This is a list of the National Register of Historic Places listings in North Cascades National Park.

This is intended to be a complete list of the properties and districts on the National Register of Historic Places in North Cascades National Park, Washington, United States.  The locations of National Register properties and districts for which the latitude and longitude coordinates are included below, may be seen in a Google map.

There are 16 properties listed on the National Register in the park.

Current listings 

|}

See also 
 National Register of Historic Places listings in Whatcom County, Washington
 National Register of Historic Places listings in Skagit County, Washington
 National Register of Historic Places listings in Chelan County, Washington
 National Register of Historic Places listings in Washington

References 

North Cascades National Park